Jong-hun, also spelled Jong-hoon, is a Korean masculine given name. The meaning differs based on the hanja used to write each syllable of the name. There are 19 hanja with the reading "jong" and 12 hanja with the reading "hun" on the South Korean government's official list of hanja which may be used in given names.

People with this name include:

Kim Jong-hoon (born 1952), South Korean politician
Jeong H. Kim (born 1961), South Korean-born American engineer
Gao Zhongxun (Go Jong-hun, born 1965) Chinese football player of Korean descent
Park Jong-hoon (born 1965), South Korean gymnast
Chang Jong-hoon (born 1968), South Korean baseball coach
Kim Jong-hoon (footballer) (born 1980), South Korean football player
Yoon Jong-hoon (born 1984), South Korean actor
Ahn Jong-hun (born 1989), South Korean footballer
Shin Jong-hun (born 1989), South Korean light flyweight amateur boxer
Choi Jong-hoon (born 1990), former South Korean guitarist, lead musician of rock band FT Island

See also
List of Korean given names

References

Korean masculine given names